QAHS may refer to:

Queen Anne High School Dunfermline, Scotland
Queensland Academy for Health Sciences, Gold Coast, Australia